The Evangelical Lutheran Church in Peru (Spanish: Iglesia Evangélica Luterana en el Perú, German: Deutschsprachige Evangelisch lutherische Kirche in Peru) is a Lutheran denomination in Peru, founded by a group of German pastors in 1924 in Lima, in association with the Evangelical Church of Germany (EKD in German). It is a member of the Lutheran World Federation, which it joined in 1957. It is a member of the Latin American Council of Churches. It is commonly known as Christuskirche (Church of Christ in German). The church offer services in both German and Spanish languages.

External links 
 
Lutheran World Federation listing

Lutheran denominations
Lutheranism in South America
Lutheran World Federation members